Svetlana Alekseevna Klyukina (born February 10, 1989, in Severodvinsk) is a Russian artistic gymnast.  She competed at the 2006 and 2007 World Artistic Gymnastics Championships as well as at the 2008 Summer Olympics in Beijing for Russia.  She earned a bronze medal with the team at the 2006 World Artistic Gymnastics Championships.

Competitive history

See also 
 List of Olympic female gymnasts for Russia

References
"From Russia: Svetlana Klyukina."

1989 births
Living people
Russian female artistic gymnasts
Olympic gymnasts of Russia
Gymnasts at the 2008 Summer Olympics
Medalists at the World Artistic Gymnastics Championships
Universiade medalists in gymnastics
Universiade silver medalists for Russia
Medalists at the 2009 Summer Universiade
People from Severodvinsk
Sportspeople from Arkhangelsk Oblast
21st-century Russian women